The Carolinian is a daily passenger train that runs between Charlotte, North Carolina and New York City. The train began operation in 1990 and is jointly funded and operated by Amtrak and the North Carolina Department of Transportation (NCDOT). The train operates over the Northeast Corridor between New York and Washington, D.C. Intermediate stops in North Carolina include Rocky Mount, Wilson, Selma, Raleigh, Cary, Durham, Burlington, Greensboro, High Point, Salisbury, and Kannapolis. The North Carolina portion of the route runs along the North Carolina Railroad, a state-owned railroad which is leased to Norfolk Southern. Northbound trains leave Charlotte at breakfast time and arrive in New York in the early evening, while southbound trains leave New York during the morning rush and arrive in Charlotte in the evening.

Additional corridor service between Charlotte and Raleigh is provided by the Piedmont. The two trains are marketed by NCDOT under the NC By Train brand.

During fiscal year 2018, the Carolinian carried 256,886 passengers, an 8% decrease from FY2017. Ridership on the Carolinian has steadily decreased since fiscal year 2013, when the Carolinian carried over 317,550 passengers. The line had a total revenue of $19,841,847 during FY2013.

History 

For most of Amtrak's first two decades, service in North Carolina was limited to long-distance trains, which were not well-suited to regional travel. The Piedmont from Greensboro to Charlotte continued to be served by Southern Railway for much of the 1970s; Southern had been one of the few large railroads to opt out of Amtrak in 1971. However, Southern drastically reduced its remaining service in 1976, including its remaining medium-haul trains going through the state, before handing its remaining service to Amtrak in 1979.

Amtrak first introduced the Carolinian on October 28, 1984, in partnership with the state of North Carolina. It ran from Charlotte to Raleigh, where it stopped at the old Seaboard Air Line Railroad station. From there, it ran to Henderson to Collier Yard south of Petersburg, Virginia. At Richmond, Virginia, the Carolinian joined the Palmetto for the journey to New York along the Northeast Corridor. The southbound train operated in the reverse direction, splitting from the Palmetto in Richmond while the Palmetto continued to Savannah. North Carolina supported the Carolinian with a $436,000 yearly subsidy from Charlotte to the Virginia line. It was the first direct Raleigh—Charlotte service in 30 years and the first North Carolina-specific service in 20 years. An early alternative name for the service was the Piedmont Palmetto.

Amtrak intended the Carolinian to be a one-year pilot project, and was very open to making the route permanent. However, while ridership exceeded expectations, revenues did not: most passengers traveled within North Carolina and did not continue to the Northeast. Amtrak was also hampered by the proliferation of cheap airfares from Charlotte and Raleigh to the Northeast. Amid losses of $800,000, Amtrak discontinued the Carolinian on September 3, 1985, after North Carolina declined to increase its subsidy. Supporters of the Carolinian blamed Amtrak and the state for not marketing the train properly; many passengers were unaware that the train went all the way to New York.

Amtrak and North Carolina re-launched the Carolinian on May 12, 1990. Like the original, it was originally a section of the Palmetto, only this time the split occurred in Rocky Mount, North Carolina. This incarnation proved successful enough that in April 1991, Amtrak made the Carolinian a full-fledged day train running from Charlotte to New York. While the Palmetto runs through from Richmond to Alexandria, Virginia; the Carolinian stops at Fredericksburg and Quantico (shared with Northeast Regional trains going to Newport News or Norfolk) before continuing on to Alexandria.

In 1995, the Carolinian was joined with a sister regional train, the Piedmont, which runs along the I-85 Corridor between Raleigh and Charlotte–the southern leg of the Carolinian. The Piedmont was originally due to enter service in 1993, but was delayed when Norfolk Southern insisted that Amtrak build a new wye in Charlotte to turn the Carolinian and Piedmont around. Previously, the southbound Carolinian had to make a time-consuming 10-mile deadhead trip to the nearest wye in Pineville, North Carolina.

Until 2004, the Carolinian also had a stop at BWI Marshall Airport Rail Station.

On March 9, 2015, a northbound Carolinian collided with a tractor-trailer that was stuck on the tracks in Halifax County, North Carolina, with 55 people injured. The locomotive landed on its side, while all of the cars remained upright. There were no fatalities, but 55 people were injured.

Long-term plans call for restoring a portion of the former Seaboard main line between Raleigh and Richmond, known as the "S-Line," as part of construction of the Southeast High Speed Rail Corridor between Charlotte and Washington. The S-Line had been abandoned in 1985, forcing Amtrak to route its trains linking Raleigh and the Northeast through Selma along the NCRR. It is estimated that restoring the S-Line will cut an hour off the train's running time by enabling a more direct route over the Virginia border.

In April 2020, NCDOT and Amtrak suspended the Carolinian as part of a larger round of service reductions in response to the COVID-19 pandemic. The Carolinian returned on May 18 as a truncated service between Charlotte and Raleigh. Full service to New York was restored on June 1.

Operation

Equipment 
Most Carolinian trains consist of six cars hauled by a locomotive.

The passenger cars are the Amfleet I series passenger cars built by the Budd Company in the mid-to-late 1970s. Most trains include a Business Class car, a Café car (food service/lounge), and four Coach Class cars. Maximum seating in such a configuration is 346, split between business class and reserved coach.

Between New York and Washington, the service operates over the Northeast Corridor which has overhead electric wires and trains are pulled by Siemens ACS-64 electric locomotives at speeds up to 

In the coming years all equipment will be replaced with Amtrak Airo trainsets, the railroad's branding of its combination of Siemens Venture passenger cars and a Siemens Charger diesel-electric locomotive. The trainsets for the Carolinian will have six passenger cars, which will include a food service area and a mix of 2x2 Coach Class and 2x1 Business Class seating. The car closest to the locomotive will be a specialized "Auxiliary Power Vehicle" which will include a pantograph to collect power from overhead lines and will feed it to four traction motors in the car, and via a DC link cable, to the four traction motors in the locomotive. The arrangement will offer a near seamless transition between power sources at Washington, a process that currently requires a time-consuming locomotive change.

Classes of service 
All classes of service include complimentary WiFi, an electric outlet (120 V, 60 Hz AC) at each seat, reading lamps, fold-out tray tables. Reservations are required on all trains, tickets may be purchased online, from an agent at some stations, a ticketing machine at most stations, or, at a higher cost, from the conductor on the train.
Coach Class: 2x2 seating. Passengers self-select seats on a first-come, first-served basis.
Business Class: 2x2 seating with more legroom than coach. Passengers receive complimentary soft drinks. Seats assigned in advance.

Route 
The Carolinian operates over Amtrak, CSX Transportation, Norfolk Southern Railway, and North Carolina Railroad trackage. Since 1871, Norfolk Southern and its predecessors have leased the NCRR from the state.
Amtrak Northeast Corridor, New York to Washington
CSX RF&P Subdivision, Richmond Terminal Subdivision, North End Subdivision, and South End Subdivision, Washington to Selma
NS Raleigh District, Selma to Greensboro (leased from NCRR)
NS Danville District, Greensboro to Linwood (leased from NCRR)
NS Charlotte District, Linwood to Charlotte (leased from NCRR)

Two Amtrak Thruway bus routes connect large swaths of eastern North Carolina to the Wilson station. One route serves Greenville, New Bern, Havelock, and Morehead City; another serves Goldsboro, Kinston, Jacksonville, and Wilmington. 

A third Thruway route runs between Winston-Salem and High Point station.

Funding 
The North Carolina Department of Transportation provides funding to operate the Carolinian from Charlotte to the Virginia border. NCDOT offers free transit passes which allow detraining Carolinian passengers in North Carolina to get one free bus ride and one transfer on the same day of travel. Passes are honored by 13 participating transit systems along its route.

Station stops 
The train has two seasonal stops in October. A station in Lexington is used during the Lexington Barbecue Festival, while an additional station in Raleigh is used for the North Carolina State Fair.

Before 2019, the northbound Carolinian followed the practice of most medium- and long-distance trains operating in the Northeast and did not allow passengers to travel only between stations on the Northeast Corridor. It only stopped to discharge passengers from Washington northward in order to keep seats available for passengers making longer trips. Starting in 2019, the northbound Carolinian began allowing local travel on the Northeast Corridor on Sundays, Thursdays and Fridays. The southbound Carolinian allows local travel in the Northeast at all times from Trenton southward.

References

Notes

External links

NCDOT Rail Division

Amtrak routes
Railway services introduced in 1990
Passenger rail transportation in New York (state)
Passenger rail transportation in New Jersey
Passenger rail transportation in Pennsylvania
Passenger rail transportation in Delaware
Passenger rail transportation in Maryland
Passenger rail transportation in Washington, D.C.
Passenger rail transportation in Virginia
Passenger rail transportation in North Carolina